Robert Cayman (17 March 1919 – 20 August 2001) was a Belgian field hockey player. He competed in the men's tournament at the 1948 Summer Olympics.

References

External links
 

1919 births
2001 deaths
Belgian male field hockey players
Olympic field hockey players of Belgium
Field hockey players at the 1948 Summer Olympics
Sportspeople from London